Wolfpen Hollow is a valley in northern Oregon County in the Ozarks of southern Missouri, United States.

 
Wolfpen Hollow took its name from the wolf pen, a device used to snare wolves.

References

Valleys of Oregon County, Missouri
Valleys of Missouri